Øyonn Groven Myhren (born 8 August 1969 in Oslo, Norway) is a Norwegian traditional folk musician and kveder.

Biography 
Groven Myhren is considered among our foremost traditional folk musicians, and has a series of first prizes from the traditional Norwegian music competition Landskappleiken. In 1997 she was awarded the Sagaprisen for her kveding. She also plays the lyre and seljefløyte (willow flute). In addition to Norwegian folk music, she has worked extensively with mediaeval music, including through the band Aurora Borealis. She released the album «Nivelkinn» (2001) in collaboration with Odd Nordstoga, and with lyrics by Aslaug Vaa, awarded Spellemannprisen 2002 in the Traditional folk music/gammaldans (folk dance) class. Groven Myhren has also worked as an actor at Det Norske Teatret, Riksteatret and Hordaland Theatre.

Groven Myhren is the daughter of the kveder and literature researcher Dagne Groven Myhren and the Spellemann and linguist Magne Myhren. She is the granddaughter of Eivind Groven.

Discography

Solo albums 
 2003: Akkedoria frå Kristiania (Etnisk Musikklubb)
 2008: Grisila og Gullveven (Etnisk Musikklubb)

Collaborations 
 With Dvergmål 
 1996: Visor og Kvæde frå Blåberglandet (Grappa GRCD 2141)
 2004: Song i Himmelsalar (Heilo HCD 7192)

 With Aurora Borealis
 1997: Harpa (Grappa GRCD4132) 1997

 With Eilert Hægeland and Alf Tveit
 1998: I Jolo (Jul På Gamlemåten) (Heilo HCD 7146)

 With Odd Nordstoga
 2002: Nivelkinn (Heilo HCD 7182)

 With Kvarts, Berit Opheim, and Birger Mistereggen
 2004: Skal, Skal Ikkje (Kvarts KVARTS 003)

 With Lars Henrik Johansen
 2015: Paa Jorden Fred Og Glæde - (Beloved Christmas Hymns Of 18th-Century Norway) (Etnisk Musikklubb)

 With Anne Hytta
 2017: Sogesong (Heilo HCD 7319)

References

External links 
 Øyonn Groven Myhren biography at Store Norske Leksikon by Kjell Bitustøyl (June 16, 2015)

Norwegian women singers
Norwegian flautists
Norwegian traditional musicians
Spellemannprisen winners
Heilo Music artists
Grappa Music artists
1969 births
Living people